William T. Swinburne (August 24, 1847 – March 3, 1928) was a rear admiral of the United States Navy and one-time Commander-in-Chief of the United States Pacific Fleet.

Biography
He was born in Newport, Rhode Island, and entered the Navy on September 29, 1862, as a cadet midshipman at the United States Naval Academy.

He graduated from the Academy in 1866 as a Passed Midshipman.  He was promoted to ensign in April 1868, master on March 26, 1869, lieutenant on March 21, 1880, and lieutenant commander in March 1887.

He was Commander-in-Chief of the Pacific Squadron from 1906 to the formation of the Pacific Fleet in 1907. He remained as Commander-in-Chief of the Pacific Fleet until his retirement on August 24, 1909.

He was a member of the California Commandery of the Military Order of the Loyal Legion of the United States and was assigned insignia number 15949.  He was also a member of the Military Order of Foreign Wars and was assigned insignia number 411.

Personal life 
Swinburne's first wife was Catherine Elsie (nee Vincent) Swinburne (1851-1904). They had one daughter, Dorothea Vincent McNamee. Swinburne's second wife was Sophie (nee Cook) Swinburne (1859-1939).

On March 3, 1928, Swinburne died in Coronado, California. Swinburne was buried at sea in accordance with his will.  His body was carried by the scout cruiser  and consigned to the sea about 20 miles off Point Loma, San Diego on March 5, 1928.

Gallery

See also
Luke McNamee, Admiral who married his daughter

References

1847 births
1928 deaths
United States Navy admirals
Union Navy officers
People from Newport, Rhode Island